Liu Miaomiao may refer to:

 Liu Miaomiao (director) (born 1962), Chinese film director
 Liu Miaomiao (film editor), see A World Without Thieves
 Liu Miaomiao (athlete) (born 1989), Paralympic long jumper from China